Now, That's More Like It is the second studio album by Craig G. It was released in 1991 via Atlantic Records. The album peaked at #97 on the Top R&B/Hip-Hop Albums and its single "U-R-Not The 1" peaked at #16 on the Hot Rap Songs.

Track listing

Personnel
 Craig Curry - main performer, co-producer (tracks: 1, 3-11, 14-15)
 Marlon Lu'ree Williams - executive producer, producer
 Salaam Remi - co-producer (tracks: 2, 12), re-mixing (track 13)
 Frank Heller - mixing
 DJ Clash - recording
 Howie Weinberg - mastering
 Francesca Spero - executive producer
 Darren Lighty - keyboards, programming, additional vocals
 Cliff Lighty - additional vocals
 Eric Williams - additional vocals
 Glen E. Friedman - photography

Charts

References

External links 

1991 albums
Craig G albums
Atlantic Records albums
Albums produced by Marley Marl
Albums produced by Salaam Remi